On 19 June 2010, a CASA C-212 Aviocar transport aircraft crashed on a flight from Yaoundé, Cameroon, to Yangadou, Republic of the Congo, killing all eleven people on board. Among the victims were the entire board of Australian mining conglomerate Sundance Resources, including mining executive Ken Talbot.

Accident
On 19 June 2010, Cam Iron – Sundance's Cameroon subsidiary – chartered a CASA C-212 Aviocar form Aéro-Service to fly their board members from Yaoundé, the capital of Cameroon, to the remote mining town of Yangadou, Republic of the Congo. The Aviocar was chartered because the company's private jet  was too large to operate into the destination airfield.

The aircraft departed from Yaoundé Airport at 09:13  and contact was last made with the aircraft at 09:51. The aircraft was scheduled to arrive at Yangadou at 10:20.

A search for the aircraft was carried out by the French Military, and the Cameroon Government, using a Transall C-160 and a Eurocopter AS 532 Cougar helicopter. The search was hampered by local fog. The wreckage of the aircraft was found on 22 June at Dima,  short of its destination and near the regional capital Djoum, Cameroon. There were no survivors among the eleven people on board.

Aircraft
The aircraft involved was CASA C-212 Aviocar registered TN-AFA. It was operated by Aéro-Service an airline that is banned from operating in the European Union due to safety concerns.

Victims
The victims were of various nationalities, and included mining magnate Ken Talbot.

References

Notes

External links

 

Aviation accidents and incidents in 2010
2010 in Cameroon
2010 in the Republic of the Congo
Accidents and incidents involving the CASA C-212 Aviocar
Aviation accidents and incidents in Cameroon
2010 disasters in Cameroon
June 2010 events in Africa